Amaryllis belladonna, the Jersey lily, belladonna-lily, naked-lady-lily, or March lily, is a plant species native to Cape Province in South Africa but widely cultivated as an ornamental. It is reportedly naturalized in many places: Corsica, Portugal, the Azores, Madeira, the Canary Islands, the Scilly Isles of Great Britain, the Democratic Republic of the Congo, Ascension Island, Australia, New Zealand, Mexico, Cuba, Haiti, the Dominican Republic, Chile, California, Texas, Louisiana, Mississippi, and the Juan Fernández Islands.

Description 
Perennial bulbous geophyte with one to two erect solid stems which appear in late summer. The inflorescence bears 2–12 showy fragrant funnel-shaped flowers on a 'naked' (leafless) stem, which gives it the common name of naked-lady-lily. The pink flowers which may be up to 10cm in length, appear in the autumn before the leaves (hysteranthy) which are narrow and strap shaped.

Taxonomy and etymology 
Amaryllis belladonna is one of the two species in the genus Amaryllis as currently circumscribed.

The specific epithet belladonna is derived from the Italian bella donna, which means beautiful lady.

Habitat 

Amaryllis belladonna is found in South Africa, where the plants are found growing among rocks.

Ecology 
Leaves of A. belladonna begin growing in early spring, or during late autumn. They last for a few weeks to a few months until they wither away, and a flower stalk will begin growing. When found in the wild, Amaryllis belladonna is pollinated by hawk moths and carpenter bees. The flower has a long-tubed, pale perianth, which fully expands at night. This flower will then release a sweet fragrance, that contains acyclic terpenoid alcohol, linalool and abundant nectar, that attracts pollinators to it. A. belladonna seeds are soft and fleshy, and appear white or pinkish. They are dispersed through wind dispersal during the winter time. This is to coincide with the first winter rain during March, and April. Seeds will germinate in as early as two weeks, but will not develop into a fully flowering plant until three to six years later.

All parts of the A. belladonna plant are toxic and contain several different alkaloids, such as lycorine, pancracine and amaryllidine. This can cause vomiting and diarrhea in humans. In wildlife these toxins will affect grazing species, and will cause drooling, vomiting, diarrhea, abdominal distress, lethargy, and heart or renal failure. Deer will avoid eating this plant, possibly due to an evolutionary relationship.

Cultivation 
The bulbs are best planted just below the surface of the soil, with the neck of the bulb level with the surface. In colder climates mulching or lifting and overwintering is required. The bulbs may be propagated from offsets. Amaryllis bulbs require little watering and are drought tolerant. This plant has gained the Royal Horticultural Society's Award of Garden Merit.

Medicinal properties 
Several compounds have been found in A. belladonna bulbs, including, 1,4-dihydroxy-3-methoxy powellan, which is an alkaloid. It has been observed that alkaloids in this plants bulb have properties to fight against malaria caused by P. falciparum.

See also

 List of plants known as lily

References

Bibliography

 
 
 
 
 

Amaryllidoideae
Garden plants of Southern Africa
Flora of the Cape Provinces
Plants described in 1753
Taxa named by Carl Linnaeus